Japan Rugby League One (formerly the Top League) is a rugby union competition in Japan. It is the highest level of professional rugby competition in the country. The Japan Rugby Football Union created the competition in 2003, by absorbing the Japan Company Rugby Football Championship, to drive up the overall standard and popularity of the sport and improve the results of the Japan national rugby union team. The chief architect of the league was Hiroaki Shukuzawa who strongly felt the urgency of improving Japanese domestic company rugby to a professional level which would allow Japan to compete more convincingly at Rugby World Cups.

Until 2022, it was an industrial league, where many players were employees of their company and the teams were all owned by major companies. While the competition was known for paying high salaries, only world-class foreign players and a small number of Japanese players played fully professionally, which meant most of the players still played in an amateur capacity. The delayed 2021 season was the final season of the Top League, with the JRFU adopting a new fully-professional three-tier system from 2022. More details about the new structure was announced to the media in January 2021. Featuring 25 teams, the 12 top-tier clubs would be split into two conferences, with seven teams competing in division two and six in division three. The new competition was formally announced as Japan Rugby League One in July 2021.

The first season in 2003–04 featured 12 teams. The league was expanded to 14 teams in 2006–07 and 16 teams in 2013–14. The Top League is played during the off-season of the Super Rugby, Therefore, many full-time foreign professionals from Southern Hemisphere countries have played in the Top League, notably Tony Brown, George Gregan and Dan Carter. In the 2010s, salaries in the Top League have risen to become some of the highest in the rugby world; in 2012, South Africa's Jaque Fourie, now with Kobelco Steelers, was widely reported to be the world's highest-paid player.

Rugby System's Divisions

The 2021 format of the first all-professional edition for the Japanese club system is divided into three divisions.

Division 1

The league consists of 12 teams based in various cities in the country.

 Black Rams Tokyo
 Green Rockets Tokatsu
 Kobelco Kobe Steelers
 Kubota Spears Funabashi Tokyo Bay
 NTT DoCoMo Red Hurricanes Osaka
 Saitama Wild Knights
 Shining Arcs Tokyo-Bay Urayasu 
 Shizuoka Blue Revs (formerly known as Yamaha Júbilo)
 Tokyo Sungoliath
 Toshiba Brave Lupus Tokyo
 Toyota Verblitz
 Yokohama Canon Eagles

Division 2

 Hanazono Kintetsu Liners
 Hino Red Dolphins
 Kamaishi Seawaves
 Mie Honda Heat
 Mitsubishi Sagamihara DynaBoars
 Skyactivs Hiroshima

Division 3
 Chugoku Red Regulions
 Kurita Water Gush Akishima
 Kyuden Voltex (without city/prefecture in the name)
 Munakata Sanix Blues
 Shimizu Koto Blue Sharks

Developments

2006–07: The league was expanded from 12 to 14 teams.
2007–08: A timekeeping system independent of the referee was introduced.
2008–09: Video referee (TMO) decisions were introduced for the Microsoft Cup play-off tournament.
2008–09: Three foreign players per team are allowed on the field at one time, one more than previously. Additionally, one member of an Asian union (such as South Korean Kim Kwang Mo for Sanyo Wild Knights) is permitted to take the field for each team. 
2009–10: One of the three foreign players allowed on the field must have played, or be eligible, for Japan. 
2013–14: The league was expanded from 14 to 16 teams.
2014–15: Video referee (TMO) decisions introduced for all league games.
2014–15: Playoff tournament sponsored as the Lixil Cup.
2021: Japan Rugby League One announced as the new league name, starting from the 2022 season.

Related competitions

A second-tier Top League Challenge Series was also introduced in 2003. Between 2003–04 and 2016–17, teams from three regional leagues would qualify to this post-season competition, in which they could either win promotion to the next season's Top League, or qualify to promotion play-off matches.

In 2017, a second-tier Top Challenge League was introduced, to operate in a league format above the regional leagues.

The regional leagues are:

 Top East League, administered by the Japan East Rugby Football Union
 Top West League, administered by the Kansai Rugby Football Union
 Top Kyūshū League, administered by the Kyūshū Rugby Football Union

With the creation of Rugby League One and its three divisions, the raison d'etre for the Top Challenge League ceased to exist, and it was discontinued.

Seasons

Sixteen teams: 2012 onwards
  
Kintetsu Liners
Kobelco Steelers
Munakata Sanix Blues
NTT DoCoMo Red Hurricanes
NEC Green Rockets
NTT Communications Shining Arcs
Ricoh Black Rams
Sanyo Wild Knights
Suntory Sungoliath
Toshiba Brave Lupus
Toyota Verblitz
Toyota Industries Shuttles
Honda Heat
Yamaha Jubilo
Hino Red Dolphins
Mitsubishi Dynaboars

Fourteen teams: 2006 to 2012

Ninth season (2011–12)

NTT Shining Arcs and Yamaha Jubilo which won their 2005 promotion/relegation play-offs (Irekaesen) against Canon Eagles and Kyuden Voltex to retain their places for the 2011–12 season. The following teams were in the league:

Coca-Cola West Red Sparks
Fukuoka Sanix Blues
Kintetsu Liners
Kobelco Steelers
NTT DoCoMo Red Hurricanes
NEC Green Rockets
NTT Communications Shining Arcs
Ricoh Black Rams
Sanyo Wild Knights
Suntory Sungoliath
Toshiba Brave Lupus
Toyota Verblitz
Honda Heat
Yamaha Jubilo

The top 4 sides of the regular season (Suntory, Toshiba, Sanyo, and NEC) competed in the 2012 Top League Champions Cup knock-out tournament for the Top League title at Chichibu, Tokyo. Suntory defeated Sanyo 47–28 in the final to win the title. Both teams met again a few weeks later in the final of the 49th All-Japan Rugby Football Championship.

Additionally, in the Wildcard play-offs, the Top League teams ranked 5th and 8th (Kintetsu Liners and Yamaha Jubilo) played each other at Hanazono, Osaka, as did the teams ranked 6th and 7th (Kobe Steelers and Ricoh Black Rams), with the winners (Kobe and Yamaha) also qualifying for the All-Japan Rugby Football Championship.

Eighth season (2010–11)

Honda Heat and Kyuden Voltex were automatically relegated at the completion of the 2009–10 season for finishing 13th and 14th. Toyota Industries Shuttles and NTT Communications Shining Arcs won promotion through the Top Challenge series. The following teams were in the league:

Coca-Cola West Red Sparks
Fukuoka Sanix Blues
Kintetsu Liners
Kobelco Steelers
Kubota Spears
NEC Green Rockets
NTT Communications Shining Arcs
Ricoh Black Rams
Sanyo Wild Knights
Suntory Sungoliath
Toshiba Brave Lupus
Toyota Verblitz
Toyota Industries Shuttles
Yamaha Jubilo

The top 4 sides (Toshiba, Sanyo, Toyota and Suntory) from the regular season competed in a knock out tournament to fight for the Top League title. In the final, Sanyo defeated Suntory 28–23.

Seventh season (2009–10)

IBM Big Blue and Yokogawa Atlastars were automatically relegated at the completion of the 2008–9 season for finishing 13th and 14th. Ricoh and Honda won promotion through the Top Challenge series. Kyuden and Sanix retained their places in Top League when they won their respective promotion and relegation play-offs. The following teams were in the league:

Coca-Cola West Red Sparks
Fukuoka Sanix Blues
Honda Heat
Kintetsu Liners
Kobelco Steelers
Kubota Spears
Kyuden Voltex
NEC Green Rockets
Ricoh Black Rams
Sanyo Wild Knights
Suntory Sungoliath
Toshiba Brave Lupus
Toyota Verblitz
Yamaha Jubilo

Sixth season (2008–9)

Kintetsu Liners returned to the league, and Yokogawa Denki were promoted for the first time (and renamed Yokogawa Musashino Atlastars in the off season). They replaced Ricoh Black Rams and Mitsubishi Sagamihara DynaBoars. The following teams were in the league:

Coca-Cola West Red Sparks
Fukuoka Sanix Blues
IBM Big Blue
Kintetsu Liners
Kobelco Steelers
Kubota Spears
Kyuden Voltex
NEC Green Rockets
Sanyo Wild Knights
Suntory Sungoliath
Toshiba Brave Lupus
Toyota Verblitz
Yamaha Jubilo
Yokogawa Musashino Atlastars

Fifth season (2007–8)

Kyuden Voltex and Mitsubishi Sagamihara DynaBoars joined the league for the first time. The following 14 teams were in the Top League in the 2007–08 season:

Coca-Cola West Red Sparks
Fukuoka Sanix Blues
IBM Big Blue
Kobelco Steelers
Kubota Spears
Kyuden Voltex
Mitsubishi Sagamihara DynaBoars
NEC Green Rockets
Ricoh Black Rams
Sanyo Wild Knights
Suntory Sungoliath
Toshiba Brave Lupus
Toyota Verblitz
Yamaha Jubilo

The top four teams (Sanyo, Suntory, Toyota and Toshiba) played in the fifth Microsoft Cup to decide the league champion. Suntory beat Sanyo 14–10 in the final to become the 2007–08 champions. Mitsubishi (14th) and Ricoh (13th) were automatically relegated.

Fourth season (2006–7)

The number of teams was increased from 12 to 14. Coca-Cola West Red Sparks became the second Kyushu-based team in the Top League. IBM returned to the league.

Coca-Cola West Red Sparks
Fukuoka Sanix Blues
IBM Big Blue
Kobelco Steelers
Kubota Spears
NEC Green Rockets
Ricoh Black Rams
Sanyo Wild Knights
Secom Rugguts
Suntory Sungoliath
Toshiba Brave Lupus
Toyota Verblitz
World Fighting Bull
Yamaha Jubilo

The top four teams in the league played in the Microsoft Cup which was officially integrated into the league from this season as the "Top League Play-off Tournament Microsoft Cup". Toshiba won the cup and also won the All-Japan Championship. Secom and World (13th and 14th) were automatically relegated, to be replaced by Kyuden Voltex, the third team from Kyushu to enter the league, and Mitsubishi Sagamihara DynaBoars from Kanto.

Twelve teams 2003 to 2006

Third season (2005–6)

After the pre-season 2005 Challenge series, Secom and Sanix returned after a year out of the league, replacing Kintetsu and IBM. The following 12 teams competed in the third season:

 Fukuoka Sanix Blues
 Kobelco Steelers
 Kubota Spears
 NEC Green Rockets
 Ricoh Black Rams
 Sanyo Wild Knights
 Secom Rugguts
 Suntory Sungoliath
 Toshiba Brave Lupus
 Toyota Verblitz
 World Fighting Bull
 Yamaha Jubilo

Toshiba again won both the league round-robin and the Microsoft Cup knockout competition contested by the top 8 teams after the regular season. Coca-Cola West Japan (now Coca-Cola West Red Sparks) gained promotion to the League at the end of the season. IBM also gained promotion to return to the league.

Second season (2004–5)

Following the 2004 Challenge series with IBM and Toyota being promoted, the following 12 teams competed in the second season:

 Kintetsu Liners
 Kobelco Steelers
 Kubota Spears
 NEC Green Rockets
 Nihon IBM Big Blue
 Ricoh Black Rams
 Sanyo Wild Knights
 Suntory Sungoliath
 Toshiba Brave Lupus
 Toyota Verblitz
 World Fighting Bull
 Yamaha Jubilo

Toshiba won both the league round-robin and the Microsoft Cup knockout competition contested by the top 8 teams after the regular season. The eleventh and twelfth teams (Kintetsu and IBM) were automatically relegated, and the ninth and tenth placed teams (World and Ricoh) had to win their 2005 promotion and relegation play-offs (Irekaesen) to stay in the Top League, which they did.

First season (2003–4)

The first season began with 12 teams:

 Fukuoka Sanix Blues
 Kintetsu Liners
 Kobelco Steelers
 Kubota Spears
 NEC Green Rockets
 Ricoh Black Rams
 Sanyo Wild Knights
 Secom Rugguts
 Suntory Sungoliath
 Toshiba Brave Lupus
 World Fighting Bull
 Yamaha Jubilo

Toshiba won the inaugural Top League title by finishing on top of the round-robin competition. The top eight teams qualified for the inaugural Microsoft Cup. Toshiba went on to lose the final of Microsoft Cup to NEC, but the cup was considered a separate competition to the Top League prior to 2007. Secom and Sanix were relegated at the end of the season. IBM and Toyota were promoted.

Champions

Notes
 * NEC Green Rockets won the Microsoft Cup in 2003–04. The Cup was considered a separate competition to the Top League prior to 2007.

Notable foreign players
The following foreign players that have played in the Top League have either won or been nominated for a major IRB award, played in a Rugby World Cup, played for a combined-nations touring side, or captained their national team.

See also

 Sport in Japan
 Rugby in Japan
 Top Challenge League (Tier 2)
 Japan national rugby union team
 Sunwolves
 Japan Company Rugby Football Championship
 Major League Rugby

References

External links
 Japan Rugby League One site
 Team profiles (English)
 Top League official site (Japanese)
 Top League video digest

 
 
Japan
Sports leagues established in 2003
2003 establishments in Japan
Professional sports leagues in Japan